Wadsworth Congregational Church is a historic African-American Congregational church located near Whitsett, Guilford County, North Carolina. It was built about 1885, and is a one-story, five bay, rectangular Gothic Revival style frame building.  The small projecting vestibule supports a bell tower.

It was listed on the National Register of Historic Places in 2002.

References

African-American history of North Carolina
Churches on the National Register of Historic Places in North Carolina
Gothic Revival church buildings in North Carolina
Churches completed in 1885
19th-century churches in the United States
Churches in Guilford County, North Carolina
National Register of Historic Places in Guilford County, North Carolina
Congregational churches in North Carolina